The 1980 Galleon Shippers season was the maiden season of the franchise in the Philippine Basketball Association (PBA).

Colors
   (dark)   (light)

New team
Galleon Shipping Corporation, a company owned by Rodolfo Cuenca, acquired the franchise of the disbanded Filmanbank. The franchise debuted in the 1980 PBA season as the Galleon Shippers. The core team was built around former Filmanbank players that included skipper Rudolf Kutch, Larry Mumar, Romulo Palijo, Nilo Cruz, Angelito Ladores and Ben Ocariza. It acquired two former U-Tex Wranglers; Anthony Dasalla and Renato Lobo, and a recruit from the amateur ranks, Robinson Obrique. The team was coached by Nic Jorge with assistant Adriano "Bong" Go, a former national youth team trainer. 

Galleon's two reinforcements in the Open Conference were Paul McCracken and 6-10 Larry Jackson. After five games, Jackson was replaced by 7-foot center Jeff Wilkins.

Won-loss record vs Opponents

Roster

References

Galleon
Galleon Shippers/CDCP Road Builders